The Apsat is a river in the Kodar Range, on the eastern side of Lake Baikal in Siberia, Russia. It is a left tributary of the Chara (Lena basin).

See also
List of rivers of Russia

References

Rivers of Zabaykalsky Krai
Stanovoy Highlands